David Connor James Law (born 4 May 1991) is a Scottish professional golfer who plays on the European Tour. He won the 2018 SSE Scottish Hydro Challenge on the Challenge Tour and had his first European Tour victory, the ISPS Handa Vic Open, in early 2019.

Amateur career
In 2009 Law won two important match-play titles, the Scottish Amateur and the Scottish Boys Amateur Championship. He won the Scottish Amateur for a second time in 2011. Law was not selected for the 2011 Walker Cup at Royal Aberdeen Golf Club despite his win in the Scottish Amateur. Soon after the selection of the Walker Cup team, Law won the Northern Open, the first amateur to win the event since 1970.

Professional career
Law turned professional in late 2011. He won the 2013 Sueno Dunes Classic on the Pro Golf Tour and finished fifth in the Order of Merit to earn a place on the Challenge Tour for 2014. Since 2014 he has played primarily on the Challenge Tour combined with some appearances on the Pro Golf Tour and the MENA Golf Tour. He had limited success on the Challenge Tour until he won the SSE Scottish Hydro Challenge at Macdonald Spey Valley in June 2018. He followed this by being runner-up in the Euram Bank Open in July and finished the season 14th in the Challenge Tour Order of Merit to earn a place on the European Tour for 2019.

Law won his maiden European Tour title in February 2019, at the ISPS Handa Vic Open, a co-sanctioned event with the PGA Tour of Australasia. He won by a one stroke margin after entering the final three holes three strokes behind. Law birdied the 16th and eagled the final hole, this coupled with Wade Ormsby double bogeying his penultimate hole, led to Law claiming victory.

Amateur wins
2009 Scottish Amateur, Scottish Boys Amateur Championship
2011 Northern Amateur (South Africa), Scottish Amateur

Professional wins (7)

European Tour wins (1)

1Co-sanctioned by the PGA Tour of Australasia

Challenge Tour wins (1)

Pro Golf Tour wins (2)

MENA Tour wins (1)

Other wins (2)
2011 Northern Open (as an amateur)
2014 Northern Open

Results in major championships

"T" = tied

Team appearances
Amateur
European Boys Team Championship (representing Scotland): 2008, 2009
European Amateur Team Championship (representing Scotland): 2011

See also
2018 Challenge Tour graduates

References

External links

Scottish male golfers
Sportspeople from Aberdeen
1991 births
Living people